Dlouhá Stráň is a municipality and village in Bruntál District in the Moravian-Silesian Region of the Czech Republic. It has about 300 inhabitants. It lies on the shore of Slezská Harta Reservoir.

According to the Austrian census of 1910 the village had 264 inhabitants, 254 (96.6%) were German-speaking. Most populous religious group were Roman Catholics with 262 (99.2%).

References

External links

Villages in Bruntál District